Tue Lassen is a Danish orienteering competitor. At the World Games in 2013 he won a silver medal in the mixed relay with the Danish team. Lassen won the Bronze medal in the sprint at the 2014 World Orienteering Championships. He runs for OK Pan Århus and Faaborg OK.

References

External links

Year of birth missing (living people)
Living people
Danish orienteers
Male orienteers
Foot orienteers
World Orienteering Championships medalists

World Games silver medalists
Competitors at the 2013 World Games
World Games medalists in orienteering